Dame Kathrin Elizabeth Thomas, DCVO, JP (20 May 1944 – 14 February 2023) was Lord Lieutenant of Mid Glamorgan from 2003 to 2019.

Thomas was appointed Companion of the Royal Victorian Order (CVO) in the 2002 New Year Honours, and advanced to Dame Commander of the Royal Victorian Order (DCVO) in the 2018 New Year Honours.

Thomas died on 14 February 2023, at the age of 78.

References

1944 births
2023 deaths
Lord-Lieutenants of Mid Glamorgan
Dames Commander of the Royal Victorian Order
Welsh justices of the peace
20th-century Welsh women
21st-century Welsh women